Ray Heffernan may refer to:

* Ray Heffernan (cricketer) (1935–2014), Australian cricketer
 Ray Heffernan (hurler), Irish hurler
 Ray Heffernan (songwriter), Irish songwriter